Harold Lord/Tennant (27 July 1892 – 5 July 1985), also known by the nickname of "Buff", was an English  professional rugby league footballer who played in the 1910s and 1920s.

Background
Harold Tennant's birth was registered in Hemsworth district, West Riding of Yorkshire, England, and he died aged 92.

Genealogical information
Harold Tennant's marriage to Grace W. (née Merrill/Murrell) was registered during first ¼ 1919 in Pontefract district. They had children; Margaret Tennant (birth registered during first ¼ 1919 in Pontefract district), the rugby league footballer Walter Tennant, the rugby league footballer for Featherstone Rovers; Nelson Tennant (birth registered during first ¼ 1923 in Pontefract district), Alice Tennant (birth registered during second ¼ 1925 in Pontefract district), Maurice Tennant (birth registered during second ¼ 1928 in Pontefract district - death registered during second ¼ 1929 (aged-1) in Pontefract district), and the rugby league footballer for Featherstone Rovers; Alan Tennant (birth registered during fourth ¼ 1930 in Pontefract district). Harold Tennant was the grandfather of Walter Tennant's son, the rugby league footballer; Clive Tennant.

References

External links

Search for "Lord" at rugbyleagueproject.org
Search for "Tennant" at rugbyleagueproject.org

1892 births
1985 deaths
English rugby league players
Hull Kingston Rovers players
People from Hemsworth
Place of death missing
Rugby league centres
Rugby league players from Wakefield
Rugby league wingers